St. Charles is a city in Madison County, Iowa, United States. The population was 640 at the time of the 2020 census. It is part of the Des Moines–West Des Moines Metropolitan Statistical Area.

History
St. Charles was platted in 1852. It was named after the city of St. Charles, Missouri. St. Charles was incorporated as a city in 1876.

Geography
St. Charles is located at  (41.287857, -93.807982).

Demographics

2010 U.S. Census
As of the 2010 United States Census, there were 653 people, 258 households, and 184 families living in the city. The racial makeup of the city was 97.1% white, 1.7% African American and 1.2% from two or more races. Hispanic or Latino of any race were 1.5% of the population.

There were 258 households, of which 38.8% had children under the age of 18 living with them, 54.7% were married couples living together, 12.8% had a female householder with no husband present, 3.9% had a male householder with no wife present, and 28.7% were non-families. 23.3% of all households were made up of individuals, and 10.5% had someone living alone who was 65 years of age or older. The average household size was 2.53 and the average family size was 2.98.

The median age in the city was 35.9 years. 28.9% of residents were under the age of 18; 5.9% were between the ages of 18 and 24; 26.8% were from 25 to 44; 25.4% were from 45 to 64; and 13% were 65 years of age or older. The gender makeup of the city was 49.3% male and 50.7% female.

2000 U.S. Census
As of the 2000 United States Census, there were 619 people, 246 households, and 171 families living in the city. The racial makeup of the city was 99.52% white, 0.16% from other races and 0.32% from two or more races. Hispanic or Latino of any race were 0.81% of the population.

There were 246 households, out of which 37.0% had children under the age of 18 living with them, 60.2% were married couples living together, 8.1% had a female householder with no husband present, and 30.1% were non-families. 26.4% of all households were made up of individuals, and 11.8% had someone living alone who was 65 years of age or older. The average household size was 2.52 and the average family size was 3.08.

In the city, the population was spread out, with 28.6% under the age of 18, 6.6% from 18 to 24, 32.3% from 25 to 44, 20.7% from 45 to 64, and 11.8% who were 65 years of age or older. The median age was 34 years. For every 100 females, there were 105.6 males. For every 100 females age 18 and over, there were 91.3 males.

The median income for a household in the city was $42,333, and the median income for a family was $45,000. Males had a median income of $31,667 versus $24,792 for females. The per capita income for the city was $18,708. About 3.6% of families and 4.0% of the population were below the poverty line, including 6.3% of those under age 18 and 2.9% of those age 65 or over.

Education
Interstate 35 Community School District serves the municipality.

Notable people
 Kim Reynolds, Governor of Iowa

References

Cities in Madison County, Iowa
Cities in Iowa
Des Moines metropolitan area
1852 establishments in Iowa